"First Time" is a song by Australian singer-songwriter Vance Joy. The song was released on 4 August 2014 as the second single from his debut studio album Dream Your Life Away (2014).

Music video
A music video to accompany the release of "First Time" was first released onto YouTube on 4 August 2014 at a total length of three minutes and fifty-six seconds.

Track listing

Charts

Release history

References

2014 singles
2014 songs
Vance Joy songs
Songs written by Vance Joy